William Boyd, 3rd Earl of Kilmarnock (died 1717) was a Scottish nobleman.

He fought for the British Government during the Jacobite rising of 1715.

References

1717 deaths
Earls of Kilmarnock
People of the Jacobite rising of 1715
Year of birth unknown